The Bayer designation p Leonis (p Leo) is shared by five star systems in the constellation Leo:
 p1 Leonis (HD 94402)
 p2 Leonis (61 Leonis)
 p3 Leonis (62 Leonis)
 p4 Leonis (65 Leonis)
 p5 Leonis (69 Leonis)

Not to be confused with:
 π Leonis
 ρ Leonis

Leonis, p
Leo (constellation)